Estadio Antonio Herrera Gutiérrez is a multi-use stadium in Barquisimeto, Venezuela.  It is currently used mostly for baseball games and serves as the home of Cardenales de Lara.  The stadium holds 20,450 people. The stadium was built between 1968–69 and finally finished in 1970. It has been the home of Cardenales de Lara since. It was first called Estadio Barquisimeto and was renamed in 1991 after former owner Antonio Herrera Gutiérrez who died in Viasa Flight 742 when the plane crashed shortly after takeoff.

References

Baseball venues in Venezuela
Sports venues completed in 1969
Estadio Antonio Herrera Gutierrez
Estadio Antonio Herrera Gutierrez
Estadio Antonio Herrera Gutierrez